The Trenta Valley is a valley in the Julian Alps in the northern part of the traditional Gorizia region of Slovenia.

Geography
The source of the Soča River and the settlements of Soča, Lepena, and Trenta are located in the Trenta Valley. The Vršič Pass connects the valley with Upper Carniola to the east. The Soča flows generally southwest through the valley and then onwards to Bovec.

Name
The name Trenta is of Friulian origin and was borrowed into Slovene. The name developed from *Tridenta, meaning 'three-tooth' or 'divided into three teeth'. This reflects the geography because the valley splits into the Soča and Zadnjica valleys, and the latter is soon split again by White Creek (Beli Potok), creating three closely spaced summits.

References

External links

 Soča - Trenta Tourist Association official website

Valleys in the Slovene Littoral
Valleys of the Julian Alps
Soča Valley
Triglav National Park
Municipality of Bovec